Anjhula Bais (Hindi: अंजुला बैस,) is an Indian-American international psychologist, trauma specialist, human rights activist and an international model. She was the youngest chair of Amnesty International Malaysia, then became elected as director for Amnesty International at their global assembly in 2019 in Johannesburg, South Africa, the first for Malaysia. She is now the Chair of the International Board of Amnesty International worldwide, the first psychologist, the first Indian and first person from Malaysia to do so.

In 2019, Bais was named a World Economic Forum Young Global Leader. In 2020, she was the recipient of the American Psychological Association Citizen Psychologist Citation. She lives in Kuala Lumpur and is married to Satish Selvanathan, a philanthropist, and great-great-grandson of Ponnambalam Arunachalam.

Early life and education

Early life 
Bais was born in the US and spent her early childhood in Lucknow, Uttar Pradesh, India. While she was still a young girl, her family moved to the US and they lived in both Chicago, Illinois and Lincoln, Nebraska. Bais is the daughter of Thakur Dr. Birendra Bikram Singh Bais, an agriculture scientist, and Thakurani Asha Singh Bais Kumari. She has two older siblings, her sister Rina and her brother Harish Paul

Education 
Bais studied psychology and philosophy at Lady Shri Ram College in New Delhi, India. She completed her master's degree in Psychoanalysis from the University College London. She got admitted for a graduate degree in psychology in Columbia University in New York but later left it and obtained her Doctorate in International Psychology from The Chicago School of Professional Psychology. Bais practices Nichiren Buddhism since 2005.

Career

Modeling 
Bais started her career as a model at the age of 18 at a campaign of Banana Republic in New York. She was awarded the “Miss Teen India” while studying at college. She was one of the top 20 finalists in Miss India. She walked the ramp at the London Fashion Week while studying at University College London.

Psychologist 
Bais started her career as a refugee psychotherapist while studying for masters at University College London. 
In 2015, Bais went to Mumbai and spent four days with the Dalai Lama discussing the intersection of religion and psychology.

Human rights activism 
Bais is the youngest chair in the history of Amnesty International Malaysia.

Media and entertainment

Filmography 
She is the Executive Producer of Hindi Short Film - Katputliwala (The Puppet master) | Father and Son Relationship by filmmaker Mitakshara Kumar of Bajirao Mastani and Padmaavat fame.

References 

Living people
American female models
Indian female models
American women psychologists
21st-century American psychologists
Indian psychologists
Indian women psychologists
Year of birth missing (living people)
21st-century American women